Adolf Humborg (January 18, 1847 Oraviţa - April 14, 1921 Munich) was an Austrian painter.  Humborg studied at the Art Academy in Vienna between 1867 and 1872. He then completed his studies at the Academy of Arts in Munich, where he attended the class of professor Alexander von Wagner (1838-1904).

Humborg specialized in painting scenes of monastic life and was renowned for capturing scenes of monks that were humorous in nature. The Glaspalast in Munich frequently exhibited his work between 1879 and 1911. Based on his success there, Humborg decided to become a permanent resident of Munich in 1913.  He also exhibited in London, where he was awarded the silver medal in 1893 and the bronze medal in 1894 for his work.

Sources 
 Revue roumaine d'histoire de l'art, Académie des Sciences Sociales et politiques de la République Socialiste de Roumanie, 1979, p. 70

External links

References

1847 births
1921 deaths
People from Oravița
19th-century Austrian painters
Austrian male painters
20th-century Austrian painters
Austrian genre painters
19th-century Austrian male artists
20th-century Austrian male artists